Israeli Canadians are Canadian citizens of Israeli descent or Israel-born people who reside in Canada. According to the 2011 Census there were 15,010 Canadians who claimed full or partial Israeli ancestry, although it is estimated that as many as 30,000 Israelis live in Canada, making it home to one of the largest Israeli diaspora groups in the world.

According to the 2016 Population Group Reference Guide published by Statistics Canada, those who trace their ancestry to present-day Israel or the greater Levant are classified as West Asian origin and visible minorities, provided they do not specify another European write-in response.

History

Many Israeli Jews emigrated to Canada throughout the period of the declaration of the state of Israel and until today. Today, the descendants of these people are known as Israeli Canadians.

Israelis began migrating to Canada shortly after the founding of the state of Israel in 1948. Thus, during the 1950s and early 1960s, began the first wave of Israeli immigration to Canada when many Israelis emigrated to that country. A second wave of immigration began in the 1970s and has continued ever since. The number of Israeli immigrants in Canada is not known with certainty, as estimates vary between 20,000 and 30,000 Israeli settled in Canada during that decade. Therefore, the actual number of Israeli immigrants in Canada is an issue that has been hotly debated since 1980. Thus, many Israeli Canadians had previously established in other countries.

During the 1980s and 1990s, Israeli immigration to Canada was increasing in large numbers for a couple of reasons. These include the ongoing Arab–Israeli conflict, Israel's connection to North American culture, as well as new economic and educational opportunities in Canada.

Demographics

Israeli Canadians by province or territory

Israeli Canadians by city

Prominent Canadians of Israeli descent

See also

Middle Eastern Canadians
West Asian Canadians
History of the Jews in Canada
Canada–Israel relations
Yerida

References

 
 
Canada
Israeli diaspora
Canada–Israel relations
Ethnic groups in Canada
Jews and Judaism in Canada
Jewish Canadian history
Middle Eastern Canadians